The 2009 NORCECA Beach Volleyball Circuit at Guatemala was held April 3–5, 2009 in Guatemala City, Guatemala. It was the second leg of the NORCECA Beach Volleyball Circuit 2009.

Women's competition

Men's competition

References

 Norceca
 BV Info (Archived 2009-08-01)
 comotedeje.com (Archived 2009-08-01)

Guatemala
Norceca Beach Volleyball Circuit (Guatemala), 2009
International volleyball competitions hosted by Guatemala